Fourcade Abasse is a French rugby league footballer who represented France in the 2000 World Cup.

He played for the Saint-Gaudens Bears club.

References

Living people
French rugby league players
France national rugby league team players
Saint-Gaudens Bears players
1979 births
Rugby league wingers